Solages is a French surname. It may refer to:

Gabriel de Solages (1711–99), French soldier and industrialist
Henri de Solages (1786–1832), French Catholic missionary
Michaelle C. Solages (b. 1985), New York State representative

Solage (or Soulage) (fl. late 14th century), French composer